Lindsey may refer to :

Places

Canada
 Lindsey Lake, Nova Scotia

England
 Parts of Lindsey, one of the historic Parts of Lincolnshire and an administrative county from 1889 to 1974
 East Lindsey, an administrative district in Lincolnshire, and a parliamentary constituency between 1983 and 1997
 West Lindsey, an administrative district in Lincolnshire
 Kingdom of Lindsey, an early medieval kingdom in the area of modern Lincolnshire
 Archdeaconry of Lindsey, created in 1933 and absorbed into the Archdeaconry of Stow & Lindsey in 1994
 Lindsey, Suffolk
 Norton Lindsey, Warwickshire

United States
 Lindsey, Ohio
 Lindsey, Wisconsin
 Lake Lindsey, Florida
 Mount Lindsey, Colorado

People 
 Lindsey (name)
 Earl of Lindsey
 Robert Bertie, 1st Duke of Ancaster and Kesteven, 1st Marquess of Lindsey

Other uses
 , a United States Navy destroyer-minelayer in commission from 1944 to 1946

See also 
 
 Lindsay (disambiguation)
 Linsay
 Linsey (disambiguation)
 Lyndsay
 Lyndsey
 Lynsay
 Lynsey